Toninho dos Santos may refer to:
Toninho dos Santos (footballer, born 1965), Brazilian footballer
Toninho dos Santos (footballer, born 1980), Bissau-Guinean footballer

See also 
Antonio dos Santos (disambiguation)